Neoponera is a genus of ants in the subfamily Ponerinae. Restricted to the Neotropics, the genus is found from southern Texas (United States) to southern Brazil. Workers are slender, and medium to large in size (6.5–19 mm); queens are similar to workers but larger and winged.

Species

Neoponera aenescens (Mayr, 1870)
Neoponera agilis Forel, 1901
Neoponera antecurvata (MacKay & MacKay, 2010)
Neoponera apicalis (Latreille, 1802)
Neoponera bactronica (Fernandes, Oliveira & Delabie, 2014)
Neoponera billemma (Fernandes, Oliveira & Delabie, 2014)
Neoponera bucki (Borgmeier, 1927)
Neoponera bugabensis (Forel, 1899)
Neoponera carbonaria (Smith, 1858)
Neoponera carinulata (Roger, 1861)
Neoponera cavinodis Mann, 1916
Neoponera chyzeri (Forel, 1907)
Neoponera commutata (Roger, 1860)
Neoponera concava (MacKay & MacKay, 2010)
Neoponera cooki (MacKay & MacKay, 2010)
Neoponera coveri (MacKay & MacKay, 2010)
Neoponera crenata (Roger, 1861)
Neoponera curvinodis (Forel, 1899)
Neoponera dismarginata (MacKay & MacKay, 2010)
Neoponera donosoi (MacKay & MacKay, 2010)
Neoponera eleonorae (Forel, 1921)
Neoponera emiliae Forel, 1901
Neoponera fauveli (Emery, 1895)
Neoponera fiebrigi Forel, 1912
Neoponera fisheri (MacKay & MacKay, 2010)
Neoponera foetida (Linnaeus, 1758)
Neoponera fusca (MacKay & MacKay, 2010)
Neoponera globularia (MacKay & MacKay, 2010)
Neoponera golbachi Kusnezov, 1969
Neoponera hispida (MacKay & MacKay, 2010)
Neoponera holcotyle (MacKay & MacKay, 2010)
Neoponera insignis (MacKay & MacKay, 2010)
Neoponera inversa (Smith, 1858)
Neoponera laevigata (Smith, 1858)
Neoponera latinoda (MacKay & MacKay, 2010)
Neoponera lineaticeps (Mayr, 1866)
Neoponera luteola (Roger, 1861)
Neoponera magnifica (Borgmeier, 1929)
Neoponera marginata (Roger, 1861)
Neoponera metanotalis (Luederwaldt, 1918)
Neoponera moesta (Mayr, 1870)
Neoponera oberthueri (Emery, 1890)
Neoponera obscuricornis (Emery, 1890)
Neoponera procidua (Emery, 1890)
Neoponera recava (MacKay & MacKay, 2010)
Neoponera rostrata (Emery, 1890)
Neoponera rugosula Emery, 1902
Neoponera schoedli (MacKay & MacKay, 2006)
Neoponera schultzi (MacKay & MacKay, 2010)
Neoponera solisi (MacKay & MacKay, 2010)
Neoponera striatinodis (Emery, 1890)
Neoponera theresiae (Forel, 1899)
Neoponera unidentata (Mayr, 1862)
Neoponera venusta Forel, 1912
Neoponera verenae Forel, 1922
Neoponera villosa (Fabricius, 1804)
Neoponera zuparkoi (MacKay & MacKay, 2010)

References

Ponerinae
Ant genera
Hymenoptera of North America
Hymenoptera of South America